Barbara J. Wilson (born November 27, 1957) is an American academic who has served as the 22nd president of the University of Iowa since July 15, 2021. She previously was provost of the University of Illinois system.

Early life and education
Wilson was born on November 27, 1957, in Appleton, Wisconsin. She earned her bachelor's degree in 1979 studying journalism at the University of Wisconsin–Madison. She went on to receive a master's degree in 1982 and a doctorate degree in communications in 1985 from the same university while working under the direction of Joanne Cantor.

Career
After receiving her doctorate degree in 1985, Wilson became an assistant professor at the University of Louisville where her research was focused on the developmental differences in children's cognitive and emotional reactions to mass media.  After three years at Louisville, Wilson left for a position at the University of California, Santa Barbara in 1988 and remained there for 12 years.

In 2014, Wilson was appointed dean of College of Liberal Arts and Sciences at University of Illinois Urbana-Champaign.

In 2015, Wilson was named acting chancellor for University of Illinois Urbana-Champaign while the campus searches for a replacement for outgoing chancellor Phyllis M. Wise.

In 2016, Wilson was appointed executive vice president for the University of Illinois System. 

On July 15, 2021, Wilson was named the 22nd president of the University of Iowa. Despite her previous record of effective oversight of athletics at Illinois, Wilson was reticent to do so for Iowa athletics under Gary Barta, who cost the University and taxpayers more than $10 million in discrimination-related settlements. Iowa state auditor Rob Sand called for Barta's ouster after a racial discrimation suit, but Wilson's office was "not interested" in comment or action afterwards.

References

Presidents of the University of Iowa
1957 births
Living people
University of Wisconsin–Madison alumni
Appleton, Wisconsin
University of Louisville faculty
University of California, Santa Barbara faculty
University of Illinois Urbana-Champaign faculty
University of Illinois System